St. Ignace Area Schools is a school district headquartered in St. Ignace, Michigan.

It includes St. Ignace, the majority of Brevort Township, and the majority of St. Ignace Township.

History

In 1966 there was a proposal to consolidate the St. Ignace district into a larger school district which would have included Brevort Township, St. Ignace Township, Moran Township, and Mackinac Island.

In 2021 Kari Visnaw became the district's superintendent.

Schools
Schools include:
 LaSalle High School 
 St. Ignace Elementary/Middle School

References

Further reading

External links
 St. Ignace Area Schools
School districts in Michigan
Education in Mackinac County, Michigan